Venator spenceri is a wolf spider (i.e., in the Lycosidae family), endemic to Australia and found in Queensland, New South Wales, Victoria, and South Australia.

It was described in 1900 by Henry Roughton Hogg.

References

External links 

 iNaturalist: Images of Venator spenceri
ALA: Venator spenceri: images and occurrence data

Spiders described in 1900
Lycosidae
Spiders of Australia